Ngome may mean:

Ngome (bread), a flatbread of Mali
Ngome, KwaZulu-Natal, a location near Nongoma, KwaZulu-Natal, South Africa
Ngome Forest, forest near Nongoma, KwaZulu-Natal, South Africa
Ngome Marian Shrine, a Marian apparition site near Nongoma
Ngome Kongwe (Old Fort), a fort on Zanzibar in Tanzania
Ahmed bin Shekhe Ngome, Sultan of Bambao 4 times in the 19th century